Caledonomorpha elegans is a species of tiger beetles in the genus Caledonomorpha. It is found in New Guinea.

References

External links 

 Caledonomorpha elegans on carabidae.pro

Cicindelidae
Beetles described in 1980
Insects of New Guinea